The Passage Beds is a member of the Corallian Oolite Formation, a geologic formation in England. The subtidal to marine sandstone preserves fossils of bivalves, gastropods, crinoids, echinoids and ammonites dating back to the Late Jurassic period (Oxfordian stage).

See also 

 List of fossiliferous stratigraphic units in England

References 

Geologic formations of the United Kingdom
Fossiliferous stratigraphic units of the United Kingdom
Jurassic England
Oxfordian Stage
Sandstone formations